Dennis D. Fitzgerald (February 28, 1943 – December 31, 2008) was the tenth Principal Deputy Director of the National Reconnaissance Office

References

2008 deaths
1943 births
Place of birth missing
National Reconnaissance Office personnel